De Gouden Kooi (The Golden Cage) is a Dutch reality competition that premiered in 2006 on Tien. The series was based on an early iteration of what would eventually become Endemol's format Big Brother.

Synopsis
The first Dutch episode on 23 September 2006 had slightly fewer than 1 million viewers (10-15% market share, it was programmed right after the Dutch Eredivisie football show, which always attracts many viewers); the two subsequent episodes received around 500,000 viewers (5-10% market share). Thereafter, the audience dropped to about 350,000 . The setting was a €2 million capital villa in Eemnes. After a few months the uglier sides of the participants came to light. A lot of millionaires were constantly plotting how to get rid of the others. Natasia, who had left behind her two young kids, refused to return home when her boyfriend who cared for them asked her to. She wanted to reach her goals first: a drivers license and breast enhancement surgery. One participant regularly ordered the use of (masked) prostitutes. Some participants started (loveless) sexual relationships, which led to jealousy and much verbal abuse. Another contestant, Nena, had to be disqualified on 2 February 2007 after she kicked another participant's leg. 2 days later, Nathanael kicked Huub and they both got into a fight. After much discussion between the directors, Huub got back into the house because he didn't physically attack Nathanael. On 30 November 2007, millionaire Dennis was about to be voted off by all of the other contestants in the house and would not be replaced by another contestant, during the vote, Dennis grabbed a chair and demolished a camera in the house, causing him to be disqualified, but also so he would be replaced with another millionaire.

Format
The housemates will live in a villa, just as in the original series. However, if contestant's lose weekly challenges the housemates with the lowest points will face elimination which will be decided by the contestants.

Each week someone is eliminated and the housemates pick someone to leave the prize money will rise.

Criticism
The concept has been heavily criticized. Because there are no nominations or votings off like in Big Brother, psychologists assume that harassment and bullying will be the only ways of getting rid of one's rivals and obtaining the reward. This would provide a very wrong role model for the youth of the Netherlands. Murray Stone therefore promised to introduce a bully referee. The producers rather expect that housemates will leave if they experience homesickness or family-complications will occur (death, birth, or sickness).

Contestants

Guest players

References

Dutch reality television series
2006 Dutch television series debuts
2008 Dutch television series endings
Tien (TV channel) original programming